The Tonga national rugby sevens team competes in the World Rugby Sevens Series. Tonga has participated in five Rugby World Cup Sevens.

Tournament history

Rugby World Cup Sevens

Tonga's first appearance was at the 1993 Rugby World Cup Sevens held in Scotland. They finished at the top of their pool and progressed to the finals with four wins and a loss to the hosts. The quarter finals were another round robin with teams split into two pools. Tonga lost all their games and finished in seventh place overall.

The 1997 Rugby World Cup Sevens was held in the mecca of sevens rugby Hong Kong. The tournament was played over three days. Day 1 and 2 had a total of eight pools with three teams per pool. Teams were seeded at the end of Day 1 and assigned to their various pools for Day 2. Tonga had a win against Japan and a loss to New Zealand.

Tonga's pool on Day 2 was a repeat of Day 1 with Japan and New Zealand being pooled together with them. Day 2 yielded the same results as the previous day. They were placed in the Plate quarter-finals and recorded wins against Wales, the Cook Islands and the hosts, Hong Kong to win the Plate and finish in ninth place.

The 2001 Rugby World Cup Sevens was held in Argentina. Tonga did not qualify.

Hong Kong hosted the Sevens World Cup in 2005 for a second time. Tonga finished at the bottom of their pool and ended up in the Bowl quarter-finals where they defeated Chinese Taipei 28 – 19. They lost to Canada in the semi-finals 7 – 0 and finished in their lowest rankings at a World Cup in 19th place.

Tonga qualified for the 2009 World Cup in the Oceania region. The United Arab Emirates were the hosts for the 2009 Rugby World Cup Sevens. Tonga were second in their pool with two wins and a loss. They made it to the Plate quarter-finals and beat Tunisia 24 – 7. However, they lost to Australia in the semis 22 – 19. They finished in eleventh place overall.

Russia were the hosts for the 2013 Rugby World Cup Sevens. Tonga won over Uruguay and advanced to the Plate quarter-finals from their pool. They lost to Canada 26 – 0 and finished in 13th place.

Olympics

Sevens World Series 
2008–09 IRB Sevens World Series

Tonga have only participated in one round of the current IRB Sevens Series so far. They managed the bowl final in their first round of this series in Wellington, they won 24–56 over Cook Islands.

2009 Wellington Sevens

Tonga were in pool "A" along with Scotland, South Africa and Kenya for the Wellington round of the IRB World Sevens Series.

2015 Hong Kong Sevens

Tonga played in the World Series Qualifier in the 2015 Hong Kong Sevens. They only managed one win against .

Commonwealth Games

Oceania Sevens

2008: 2nd
2009: 2nd
2010: 3rd
2011: 3rd
2012: 3rd
2013: Did not compete
2014: 6th
2015: 2nd
2016: 5th
2017: 7th
2018: 5th

Players

Notable players
Malakai Fekitoa (Former All Black)
Cooper Vuna (Former Wallaby)
Jack Ram
Lopeti Timani (Former Wallaby)
Afusipa Taumoepeau

References

National rugby sevens teams
S